Liz Bangerter (born 1974) was a Republican member of the Montana House of Representatives.

Bangerter was elected to the Montana House of Representatives in 2010.  Bangerter is a member of the Church of Jesus Christ of Latter-day Saints. She attended Central Wyoming College. She also has a certificate in medical office technology from the University of Montana-Helena College of Technology. Bangerter and her husband Carl are the parents of three daughters.

Moffie Funk (D), a Helena teacher defeated Bangerter in the November General Election of 2014.

Sources

Mormon Times, Feb. 5, 2011.
"Project Vote Smart" entry for Bangerter
Bangerter's campaign bio
Helena Independent Record October 14, 2010

1974 births
Living people
Latter Day Saints from Wyoming
Central Wyoming College alumni
University of Montana alumni
Republican Party members of the Montana House of Representatives
Women state legislators in Montana
Latter Day Saints from Montana
21st-century American women